Lesticus ambulator is a species of ground beetle in the subfamily Pterostichinae. It was described by Darlington in 1962.

References

Lesticus
Beetles described in 1962